Bear River National Forest was established as the Bear River Forest Reserve by the U.S. Forest Service in Utah on May 28, 1906  with  by combining the Logan Forest Reserve with other lands.  On March 4, 1907 it became a National Forest. On July 1, 1908 part of the forest was combined with Pocatello National Forest and the remainder was used to establish Cache National Forest. The name was discontinued.  The lands are presently included in Uinta-Wasatch-Cache National Forest.

References

External links
Forest History Society
Forest History Society:Listing of the National Forests of the United States Text from Davis, Richard C., ed. Encyclopedia of American Forest and Conservation History. New York: Macmillan Publishing Company for the Forest History Society, 1983. Vol. II, pp. 743-788.

Former National Forests of Utah
Defunct forest reserves of the United States